

The GeoRef database is a bibliographic database that indexes scientific literature in the geosciences, including geology. Coverage ranges from 1666 to the present for North American literature, and 1933 to the present for the rest of the world. It currently contains more than 4.3 million references. It is widely considered one of the preeminent literature databases for those studying the earth sciences.

It is produced by the American Geosciences Institute, which was known as the American Geological Institute until October 2011.

"To maintain the database, GeoRef editor/indexers regularly scan more than 3,500 journals in 40 languages as well as new books, maps, and reports. They record the bibliographic data for each document and assign index terms to describe it. Each month between 6,000 and 9,000 new references are added to the database."

Major areas of coverage by GeoRef include:
 Areal geology
 Economic geology
 Engineering geology
 Environmental geology
 Extraterrestrial geology
 Geochemistry
 Geochronology
 Geophysics
 Hydrogeology and hydrology
 Marine geology and oceanography
 Mathematical geology
 Mineralogy and Crystallography
 Paleontology
 Petrology
 Seismology
 Stratigraphy
 Structural geology
 Surficial geology

Print publications that correspond to GeoRef are Bibliography and Index of North American Geology; Bibliography of Theses in Geology; and the Geophysical Abstracts, Bibliography and Index of Geology Exclusive of North America.

See also
List of academic databases and search engines

References

Bibliography

External links
  of the GeoRef database
  of the American Geosciences Institute

Earth sciences
Bibliographic databases and indexes
Scientific databases
Geographical databases